Brown Township is one of the twelve townships of Paulding County, Ohio, United States.  The 2000 census found 2,244 people in the township, 1,315 of whom lived in the unincorporated portions of the township.

Geography
Located in the eastern part of the county, it borders the following townships:
Auglaize Township - north
Highland Township, Defiance County - northeast corner
Monroe Township, Putnam County - east
Perry Township, Putnam County - southeast
Washington Township - south
Latty Township - southwest corner
Jackson Township - west

Two villages are located in Brown Township: Melrose in the southwestern part of the township, and Oakwood in the southeastern part of the township.

Name and history
It is one of eight Brown Townships statewide.

Government
The township is governed by a three-member board of trustees, who are elected in November of odd-numbered years to a four-year term beginning on the following January 1. Two are elected in the year after the presidential election and one is elected in the year before it. There is also an elected township fiscal officer, who serves a four-year term beginning on April 1 of the year after the election, which is held in November of the year before the presidential election. Vacancies in the fiscal officership or on the board of trustees are filled by the remaining trustees.

References

External links
County website

Townships in Paulding County, Ohio
Townships in Ohio